Hamidou is both a surname and a given name. Notable people with the name include:

Surname:
Jules Hamidou (born 1987), Chadian footballer
Souleymanou Hamidou (born 1973), Cameroonian footballer

Given name:
Raïs Hamidou (1773–1815), Algerian corsair (Raïs here is used as a title. It comes from the arabic رَئِيس‎ (raʾīs,) which means “leader, chief, head”.
Hamidou Djibo (born 1985), Nigerien footballer
 Hamidou Diallo (born 1998), American Basketball player
Hamidou Benmessaoud (1935–2013), Moroccan actor

Surnames of Algerian origin
Arabic-language surnames